Marginella claudoni is a species of sea snail, a marine gastropod mollusk in the family Marginellidae, the margin snails.

This is a "species inquirenda", i.e. a species of doubtful identity needing further investigation.

Description

Distribution

References

Marginellidae